Benito Juárez Municipality is a municipality in Tlaxcala in south-eastern Mexico. This municipality was founded in 1995. It used to be a town of the municipality of Sanctórum de Lázaro Cárdenas.

References

Municipalities of Tlaxcala